The Minister of Health (Italian: Ministro della Salute) in Italy is one of the positions in the Italian government. The ministry was officially established in 1958, with Vincenzo Monaldi, of the Christian Democracy, serving as the first minister. From 1946 to 1958, the position was held by a High Commissioners for Hygiene and Public Health, who was not a minister but a special commissioner. Nicola Perrotti, of the Italian Socialist Party, served as the first high commissioner.

The current head of the Ministry of Health is professor Orazio Schillaci, appointed on 22 October 2022 by Prime Minister Giorgia Meloni.

List of Italian Ministers of Health

 Parties
1958–1994:

1994–present:

Coalitions:

Timeline

See also
Ministry of Health (Italy)

External links
Ministero della Salute, Official website of the Ministry of Health

References

Health